Baudette is a city in, and the county seat of, Lake of the Woods County, Minnesota, United States. As of the 2010 census, its population was 1,106, and in 2018 the population was estimated at 1,003. Baudette is known as the Walleye Capital of the World.

History
Baudette was incorporated in 1907. It was started by European Americans as a steamboat landing and lumber town with a sawmill, after the railroad was constructed through this area in 1901. It was named for Joseph Beaudette, a trapper of French-Canadian descent who had been in the area since the early 1880s. The post office at Baudette began in 1900, first called "Port Hyland", after postmaster Daniel Hyland. The name was changed to "Baudette" in 1901. Baudette had a station of the Minnesota and Manitoba Railroad, now absorbed by the Canadian National Railway.

Baudette was largely destroyed in the Baudette Fire of 1910, but was quickly rebuilt. Many of its people were saved by a train with boxcars sent across the river from Rainy River, Ontario, which pulled survivors to safety on the other side.

Geography
The city is along the Rainy River at its confluence with the Baudette River. It lies across the river from Rainy River, Ontario, and southeast of Lake of the Woods.

Baudette and Rainy River are connected by the Baudette–Rainy River International Bridge.

Minnesota Highway 11, Minnesota Highway 72, and Minnesota Highway 172 are three of the community's main routes. Highway 11 leads northwest  to Warroad at the southwest end of Lake of the Woods and east  to International Falls, while Highway 72 leads south  to Blackduck and Highway 172 leads north  to Wheelers Point at the mouth of the Rainy River into Lake of the Woods.

Climate
Baudette has a humid continental climate (Köppen Dfb) with mild to warm summers along with dry and severely cold winters.

Demographics

2010 census
As of the census of 2010, there were 1,106 people, 489 households, and 273 families living in the city. The racial makeup of the city was 94.4% White, makes up 0.1% African American, 0.7% Native American, 0.8% Asian, 0.5% from other races, and 3.4% from two or more races. Hispanic or Latino of any race were 1.8% of the population.

There were 489 households, of which 27.8% had children under the age of 18 living with them, 41.9% were married couples living together, 10.0% had a female householder with no husband present, 3.9% had a male householder with no wife present, and 44.2% were non-families. 39.7% of all households were made up of individuals, and 18.2% had someone living alone who was 65 years of age or older. The average household size was 2.17 and the average family size was 2.95.

The median age in the city was 46.1 years. 23.5% of residents were under the age of 18; 5.4% were between the ages of 18 and 24; 19.8% were from 25 to 44; 29% were from 45 to 64; and 22.2% were 65 years of age or older. The gender makeup of the city was 46.3% male and 53.7% female.

2000 census
As of the 2000 census, there were 1,104 people, 490 households, and 271 families living in the city. The racial makeup of the city was 94.02% White, 0.54% African American, 2.90% Native American, 0.36% Asian, 0.18% from other races, and 1.99% from two or more races. Hispanic or Latino of any race were 0.72% of the population.

There were 490 households, out of which 28.0% had children under the age of 18 living with them, 43.1% were married couples living together, 9.6% had a female householder with no husband present, and 44.5% were non-families. 41.0% of all households were made up of individuals, and 22.2% had someone living alone who was 65 years of age or older.  The average household size was 2.16 and the average family size was 2.97.

In the city, the population was spread out, with 24.7% under the age of 18, 5.9% from 18 to 24, 23.0% from 25 to 44, 21.9% from 45 to 64, and 24.5% who were 65 years of age or older.  The median age was 42 years. For every 100 females, there were 86.8 males.  For every 100 females age 18 and over, there were 82.2 males.

The median income for a household in the city was $31,281, and the median income for a family was $43,000. Males had a median income of $32,500 versus $22,500 for females. The per capita income for the city was $16,653.  About 6.5% of families and 9.1% of the population were below the poverty line, including 7.6% of those under age 18 and 17.6% of those age 65 or over.

Economy
Baudette was home to Rowell Laboratories, Inc., a manufacturer of pharmaceutical products, from 1935 to 1986. Rowell initially achieved success by processing and selling burbot liver oil, after it was discovered to improve the fur of foxes living in the Rowell family fox farm. Rowell's downtown location is now home to ANI Pharmaceuticals Inc.

Automotive Enviro Testing, a cold weather test facility used by Honda, Acura, and Tesla, is in Baudette.

Media

Radio
 KRWB (AM) 1410 Roseau
 KKWQ 92.5 Warroad
 KPMI-FM 94.5 Baudette
 KCAJ-FM 102.1 Roseau

Television

Notable people
Keith Ballard, ice hockey defenseman for the Minnesota Wild
Alex Lyon, ice hockey goaltender
Wally Olds, ice hockey defenseman, 1972 Silver Medal Olympian and All-American; also has his likeness painted on the side of the VFW
Theodore H. Rowell, pharmaceutical industrialist and politician

See also
Baudette International Airport

References

External links
Official website
Baudette Chamber of Commerce
Baudette photo gallery

 
Cities in Minnesota
Cities in Lake of the Woods County, Minnesota
County seats in Minnesota
1907 establishments in Minnesota